Madiha Rana (born 15 October 1986) is a Pakistani politician who was a Member of the Provincial Assembly of the Punjab, from May 2013 to May 2018.

Early life and education
She was born on 15 October 1986 in Kuwait.

She graduated in 2010 form the University of the Punjab and has the degree of Bachelor of Arts.

Political career

She was elected to the Provincial Assembly of the Punjab as a candidate of Pakistan Muslim League (N) on a reserved seat for women in 2013 Pakistani general election.

References

Living people
Punjab MPAs 2013–2018
Women members of the Provincial Assembly of the Punjab
1986 births
Pakistan Muslim League (N) politicians
21st-century Pakistani women politicians